The LSU Tennis Complex is a tennis facility located on the campus of Louisiana State University in Baton Rouge, LA. The facility, built in 2015, serves as the home of the LSU Tigers and LSU Lady Tigers tennis teams. It has a seating capacity of 1,400.

The facility provides six indoor tennis courts with a second floor grandstand that seats 300 covering 75,000 square feet. The complex also includes 12 lighted outdoor courts with a grandstand. The complex also offers the Tigers and Lady Tigers state-of-the-art locker rooms, a meeting room, players lounge, equipment room, coaches' offices, strength and conditioning center, satellite athletic training room and media room.

The LSU Tennis Complex hosted the 2016 SEC Women's tennis tournament.

Gallery

See also
LSU Tigers and Lady Tigers
W.T. "Dub" Robinson Stadium

References

External links
LSU Tennis Facility at LSUSports.net

College tennis venues in the United States
LSU Tigers tennis venues
LSU Lady Tigers tennis venues
Tennis venues in Louisiana
Tennis venues in Baton Rouge, Louisiana
Sports venues completed in 2015
2015 establishments in Louisiana